Jordan Ferry is a community of the Municipality of the District of Shelburne in the Canadian province of Nova Scotia.

References
 Jordan Ferry on Destination Nova Scotia

Communities in Shelburne County, Nova Scotia
General Service Areas in Nova Scotia